Martin Bronstein (born 1935) is a British-Canadian actor, writer, columnist, broadcaster and journalist.

Early life and education
Bronstein was born in London, England.

Career
Bronstein moved to Canada in 1959 and worked as a copywriter, journalist and comedy writer. He also worked for the Canadian Broadcasting Corporation interviewing a series of entertainers, including Oscar Peterson, Dave Brubeck, Bob Dylan, Jack Benny, Dudley Moore, Dizzy Gillespie, Sir Malcolm Sargent, Nina Simone, and Duke Ellington.  With John Morgan, he wrote a comedy series, Funny You Should Say That, for CBC.

Bronstein was a founding member in 1970 of the Jest Society, which became the Royal Canadian Air Farce in 1973. He left the comedy troupe to return to journalism in 1974 but continued to write for the troupe for the rest of the decade. In 1982, he returned to Britain to become editor of Squash Player International magazine and has written extensively on the sport in the ensuing decades.

References

External links 
 Royal Canadian Air Farce history
 Canada's Walk of Fame
 

1935 births
Living people
CBC Radio hosts
Canadian male comedians
Canadian male journalists
Canadian male non-fiction writers
Canadian television personalities
Canadian male screenwriters
Canadian sketch comedians
Comedians from London
Comedians from Montreal
English male journalists
Journalists from London
Journalists from Montreal
Royal Canadian Air Farce
Television personalities from Montreal
English emigrants to Canada
Writers from London
Writers from Montreal
20th-century Canadian comedians
20th-century Canadian screenwriters
20th-century Canadian male writers